Waldo Sanhueza Carrasco (16 July 1900 – 3 February 1966) was a Chilean former football manager.

He is honorary president of Santiago Morning and highlighted as player, manager and president of Colo-Colo.

References

1900 births
1966 deaths
Chilean footballers
Unión Española footballers
Colo-Colo footballers
Chilean football managers
Chilean Primera División managers
Colo-Colo managers
Association footballers not categorized by position
People from Concepción, Chile